The Alice Band were a pop group formed in 2000 by Rob Dickins and featured the artists Charity Hair from Florida, Amy Lindop from Glasgow and Audrey Nugent from Dublin. All three artists were vocalists and played guitar.

Discography

Album
The Alice Band's only album release was The Love Junk Store (2002).
The album was produced by Giles Martin and released by Instant Karma. It featured the singles "One Day at a Time", "Nothin’ On But the Radio" and "Now That You Love Me". "Nothin' On But the Radio" also featured on Disc 1 of the Pepsi Chart 2002 album.

The album received mixed reviews. Ian Hyland of The Sunday Mirror gave it 7/10 and Mike Pattenden of The Times gave it 3*. The Express on Sunday called the music "catchy country pop tunes" whilst it was received negatively by The Express, "unexceptional and lightweight"; Sunday Tribune, "Soulless stuff"; and Sunday Mercurys Paul Cole wrote that most of the album is "blandly forgettable". The Observer wrote that the "trio reeks of commercial calculation" and the album had "catchy if clichéd songs".The Love Junk Store''''' (2002)

Singles
"One Day at a Time" (2001)

"Nothing On But the Radio" (2002)
"Now That You Love Me" (2002)

"(Don't Fear) The Reaper" (2002) (Blue Öyster Cult cover)

After the band 
Amy Lindop, now known as Amy Belle, and Audrey Nugent are solo artists. Charity Hair is the lead singer for The Ailerons and singer for Red Sky July.

References 

Musical groups established in 2000
Pop music groups